Statistics of Allsvenskan in season 1963.

Overview
The league was contested by 12 teams, with IFK Norrköping winning the championship. It started on 15 April and ended on 20 October.

League table

Results

Footnotes

References 

Allsvenskan seasons
1
Sweden
Sweden